Om Prakash Yadhav Gulzari is Nepali politician, belonging to the Madhesi Janadhikar Forum. In 2007, Yadav was accused of the murder of two regional Young Communist League leaders. In the 2008 Constituent Assembly election he was elected from the Rupandehi-2 constituency, winning 10612 votes.

References

Living people
Madhesi Jana Adhikar Forum, Nepal politicians
Year of birth missing (living people)

Members of the 1st Nepalese Constituent Assembly